Helen May Rowland (1875–1950) was an American journalist and humorist. For many years she wrote a column in the New York World called "Reflections of a Bachelor Girl". Many of her pithy insights from these columns were published in book form, including Reflections of a Bachelor Girl (1909), The Rubáiyát of a Bachelor (1915), and A Guide to Men (1922).

Namesakes
She is often confused with the vaudevillian and singer Helen Rowland, who was later billed professionally as Helene Daniels. Born as Helen Hannah Rubin (September 28, 1908, Bronx, New York - October 15th, 1992, New York), she started in 1927 as a vaudeville performer, opposite Ohio native  "Muriel Malone" (born 1910/1911 - died April, 1980, Greenville, South Carolina) as duo "Rubin and Malone", and sang on radio and recordings during the 1930s and early 1940s. A silent film child actress, also had the same name, and was often credited as "Baby Helen Rowland" and briefly as "Baby Helen Lee" (during her second film appearance), distinguishing her from both the journalist and the singer.

Books 
 Reflections of a Bachelor (1903)
 A Book of Conversations: The Digressions of Polly (1905) 
 The Widow (1908)
 Reflections of a Bachelor Girl (1909)
 The sayings of Mrs. Solomon: Being the confessions of the seven hundredth wife as revealed to Helen Rowland (1913)
 The Rubaiyat of a Bachelor (1915)
 A Guide To Men: Being Encore Reflections of a Bachelor Girl (1922) A Guide to Men, Project Gutenberg
 If, A Chant for Wives also The White Woman's Burden (1927)
 This Married Life (1927)

References

External links

 
 
 
 List of quotes

1875 births
1950 deaths
American women journalists
American humorists
Women humorists